Omega Phi Alpha is an American national service sorority. Omega Phi Alpha, also known as OPhiA, currently has 29 active chapters in the United States, as well as two prospective new chapters and one interest group.

History
In 1953, several female students at Bowling Green State University expressed an interest in having an organization like the national service fraternity Alpha Phi Omega which was active on their campus. The brothers of the Zeta Kappa chapter Alpha Phi Omega changed their plans to form a second fraternity and instead helped establish a new service sorority at Bowling Green State University.

The two groups were to be alike in objectives—friendship, leadership, and service. A similar name—Omega Phi Alpha—was chosen for the sorority. Just as the Alpha Phi Omega chapter was limited to former Boy Scouts, the Omega Phi Alpha sorority was originally limited to former Girl Scouts and Campfire Girls.

However, these chapters operated independently and were not incorporated as a national sorority. In early 1966, the Bowling Green sorority received a letter indicating that the other two had merged to create a national sorority and invited them to join. However, the new national group had not registered legally. Upon learning this, Omega Phi Alpha at Bowling Green registered and invited the two groups to affiliate with it.

The three groups met at a national convention in Bowling Green, Ohio in 1967. On June 15, 1967, the groups agreed to consolidate as a national sorority and laid the foundations for what is currently Omega Phi Alpha. They also decided that Bowling Green was the Alpha chapter. The University of Bridgeport became the Beta chapter, and Eastern Michigan was named the Gamma chapter.

Other chapters were added through the Alpha Upsilon chapter at University of Tennessee Knoxville in 2022. Omega Phi Alpha has nine districts of active chapters. Each district is encouraged to meet once a year and is required to hold a district summit in the convention off-year, which includes service projects, workshops, and sisterhood activities.

Symbols 
The chevron and the bee are Omega Phi Alpha's symbols. Its flower is the yellow rose, chose to represent friendship. The sorority's colors are dark blue, gold, and light blue. Omega Phi Alpha has two badges: one for active members and the other for alumna. The active badge is a diamond with concave sides. The alumna badge is round and features a rose. On top of the circle is a chevron with the sorority's name.

Purpose 
The purpose of Omega Phi Alpha reads as follows:

The purpose and goals of this sorority shall be to assemble its members in the fellowship of Omega Phi Alpha, to develop friendship, leadership, and cooperation by promoting service to the university community, to the community at large, to the members of the sorority, and the nations of the world.

Activities 
Omega Phi Alpha has a diverse, flexible service program that allows each member to contribute to the world around her. Many chapters have ongoing projects that they have worked with for years.

Six areas of service

1.  Permanent Project 
The permanent project is mental health. Mental health service projects are defined as any project that improves the well-being of others, and these projects are typically hands-on projects such as playing with kids in an afterschool program, playing Bingo at a nursing home, or serving meals at a soup kitchen.

2.  President's Project 
Each year at the Omega Phi Alpha National Convention, the national president of Omega Phi Alpha presents the cause she feels is worthy of being the focus of OPA service nationwide. Past president's projects prior to 2002 include the environment, terminal illness, AIDS awareness and education, domestic violence, "Just Say No To Drugs", handicapped children, nursing, ecology, heart disease, children, the elderly, head injury prevention, literacy, and internal organization key points. 

The president's projects by year include:

 1968–1969: Mental health
 1970–1971: Ecology
 1973–1974: Elderly
 1974–1975: Muscular dystrophy
 1977–1978: Heart disease
 1979–1980: International Year of the Child
 1980–1981: Hands across the ages - working with the elderly
 1982–1983: Girl Scouts of the USA
 1983–1984: National Head Injury Foundation
 1984–1985: Alcohol awareness
 1990–1991: Environment
 1991–1992: Cultural diversity
 1993–1994: AIDS education
 1995–1996:  Breast cancer
 1996–1997:  Ronald McDonald House
 2002–2003: Girl Scouts of the USA
 2003–2004: Alcohol abuse prevention/Alcohol Awareness
 2004–2005: Support your sisterhood
 2005–2006: Education
 2006–2007: Women's health
 2007–2008: Domestic violence awareness
 2008–2009: Women's cancer awareness
 2009–2010: Literacy
 2010–2011: Money management
 2011–2012: Archiving OPA
 2012–2013: Community inclusion
 2013–2014: Empowering women in STEM 
 2014–2015: Physical fitness and healthy living
 2015–2016: Mental health matters
 2016–2017: Chapter choice
 2017–2018: Childhood obesity
 2018–2019: Building two thousand bridges
 2019–2020: Literacy
 2020–2021: Food insecurity: hunger in America
 2021-2022: Erasing racial and ethnic health disparities
 2022-present: Protecting human rights

3.  Service to the University Community 
Sisters provide service within their university's community by volunteering at school events, holding stress relief classes, and  random acts of kindness,

4.  Service to the Community at Large 
Sisters help the community at large by participating in local park clean-ups, food banks, tutoring at a local school, and volunteering at the Humane Society.

5.  Service to the members of the sorority 
Sisters provide service to the members of the sorority by supporting alumnae and internal strengthening.

6.  Service to the nations of the world 
To serve the nations of the world, sisters have raised funds for UNICEF, AIDS Awareness, diabetes awareness (American Diabetes Association), breast cancer awareness (Susan G. Komen Breast Cancer Foundation, among others).

Chapters
The active chapters of Omega Phi Alpha are in bold and the inactive chapters are in italic.

Notes

Convention 
Omega Phi Alpha holds a national convention every other year.  The national conventions provide a forum for making sorority-wide decisions like aligning on a budget, electing national officers, or changing the national policies reflected in the constitution and by-laws.  Each active chapter in good standing has two votes to use in deciding sorority issues.  Active chapters that are not in good standing have only one vote.  Some alumnae delegates represent each of OPA's four districts. For every three active votes, alumnae get one vote.

OPA national convention locations include:

Alumnae groups 
Omega Phi Alpha has seven regions of alumnae that are drawn on state lines and are based on the population distribution of OPA alumnae. The regions are Mid-Atlantic, Mid-South, Midwest, Northeast, South, Southeast, and  West, Each alumnae region sends a specific number of delegates to OPhiA's National Convention every year; this number is based on the number of active votes possible at that year's Convention. Alumnae representation makes up 25% of the total representation at any given convention.

References

External links

 Bowling Green State University chapter website

 Texas A&M chapter website
 University of Florida chapter website

Fraternities and sororities in the United States
Service organizations based in the United States
1967 establishments in Ohio
Student organizations established in 1967